The Periphery is a 1995 role-playing game supplement for BattleTech and MechWarrior published by FASA.

Contents
The Periphery details the Periphery worlds on the edges of the Inner Sphere, with one section for each of the five largest periphery powers.

Reception
James Swallow reviewed The Periphery for Arcane magazine, rating it an 8 out of 10 overall. Swallow comments that "The Periphery is a sourcebook for the referee who wants to get on with it alone, and the rich setting is perfect for a Frontier, Mercenary or Pirate campaign. There's ample room for budding warlords to carve out their own republics through force of arms, engage in politics or just pound the lubricant out of each other's mechs. Definitely worth a look by any BattleTech gamers seeking fresh pastures."

References

BattleTech supplements
Role-playing game supplements introduced in 1995
Science fiction role-playing game supplements